Manoj Pandey is an Indian voice actor who specializes for performing voices for dubbing foreign productions into the Hindi and other languages. He speaks English, Hindi, Punjabi, Bhojpuri, Urdu and Oriya as his mother tongue languages.

Filmography

Animated series

Dubbing career
Pandey has been leading his voice for characters into foreign dubbed content in the Mumbai region. He is the Hindi dub voice for Alex the Lion in the Madagascar film series.

Dubbing roles

Animated series

Live action television series

Live action films

Hollywood and other foreign-language films

Indian films

Animated films

References

External links
 

Place of birth missing (living people)
Male actors from Varanasi
Indian male voice actors
Living people
Male actors in Hindi cinema
20th-century Indian male actors
21st-century Indian male actors
1967 births